Always is an album released in 1980, promoting some material of country singer Patsy Cline's work from the 1960s.

The album included an overdub single in 1980 titled "Always". The song peaked at No. 18 on the US country singles chart that year, and it was a return to prominence for Cline.

AllMusic reports that, "In 1980, Bradley took ten of Cline's master tapes and wiped everything but the original lead vocals, brought in a cast of session folks, backup singers, and string players and remade vintage tunes."

Track listing

Personnel
Track information and credits adapted from AllMusic.

Musicians
Patsy Cline – vocals
David Briggs – piano
Jerry Carrigan – drums
Johnny Christopher – acoustic guitar
Sonny Garrish – steel guitar
Mike Leech – bass, baritone sax
Kenny Malone – drums
Billy Sanford – electric guitar
Reggie Young – electric guitar

Production
Owen Bradley – producer
Milan Bogdan – remastering
Jim Lloyd – remastering
Benny Quinn – remastering
Glenn Meadows – remastering
Jerry Joyner – design
Simon Levy – art direction
Virginia Team – art direction

Charts

Singles

References

1980 albums
Patsy Cline albums
Albums produced by Owen Bradley
Albums published posthumously
MCA Records albums